S63 may refer to:

Aviation 
 Savoia-Marchetti S.63, an Italian flying boat
 Sikorsky S-63, an American helicopter
 Skyharbor Airport, in Dallas County, Alabama, United States

Other uses 
 S-63 (encryption standard), securing electronic navigational chart data
 S63 (Long Island bus), United States
 BMW S63, an automobile engine
 , a submarine of the Indian Navy
 Mercedes-Benz S63 AMG, a German sedan
 S63: In case of accident by inhalation: remove casualty to fresh air and keep at rest, a safety phrase
 
 S63, a postcode district for Rotherham, England